Brian Woodall may refer to:

 Brian Woodall (footballer, born 1948) (1948–2007), English football player for Sheffield Wednesday, Oldham Athletic, Chester and Crewe Alexandra
 Brian Woodall (footballer, born 1987), English football player for Dagenham & Redbridge